General elections were held in the Cook Islands on 7 September 2004. Initial results showed the Democratic Party winning by a wide margin, but close results led to 11 electoral petitions being filed, delaying the date Parliament could sit until mid-December.  In the interim, Prime Minister Robert Woonton announced that he was forming a coalition government with the rival Cook Islands Party. This led to a split within the Democrats, with Woonton and four other MPs leaving to form the Demo Tumu Party.  With 14 MPs, the coalition had a comfortable majority in Parliament.

The results of the electoral petitions saw the seat of Titikaveka change hands while Woonton's seat was a dead tie.  Woonton subsequently resigned in order to fight a by-election, causing his government to be dissolved.  He was succeeded by his deputy, Jim Marurai.

Results

By electorate

References

Elections in the Cook Islands
Cook
2004 in the Cook Islands
Cook
Election and referendum articles with incomplete results